John Finlayson or Finleyson (1770–1854) was a disciple of Richard Brothers. Finlayson was born in Scotland in 1770. His descendants make him the second son of Colonel John Hamilton M'Finlay, who married, about 1765, Lady Elizabeth Mary Alexander, eldest sister of the last Earl of Stirling. He was originally a writer at Cupar, Fife, and removed thence to Edinburgh. His relations with Brothers, which began in 1797, are detailed in the article on that enthusiast. He printed at Edinburgh a couple of pamphlets before repairing to London. In London he was 'in considerable practice as a house agent.' Brothers led him to change the spelling of his name, by telling him his ancestors had some 'fine leys' of land granted them for deeds of valour. Brothers, who died (1824) in Finlayson's house at Marylebone, made it his dying charge to his friend that he should write against a rival genius, Bartholomew Prescot of Liverpool. This Finlayson did, describing Prescot's 'System of the Universe,' very correctly, as a 'misapprehended mistaken elaborate performance, or book.'

Publications
He printed a variety of pamphlets, reiterating Brothers's views, and developing his own peculiar notions of astronomy, for which he claimed a divine origin. The heavenly bodies were created, he thinks, partly 'to amuse us in observing them.' The earth he decides to be a perfect sphere, 'not shaped like a garden turnip, as the Newtonians make it;' the sun is a created body 'very different from anything we can make here below;' the stars are 'oval-shaped immense masses of frozen water, with their largest ends foremost.'

Finlayson printed:
 'An Admonition to the People of all Countries in support of Richard Brothers,' 8vo (dated Edinburgh, 7 September 1797). 
 The same, 'Book Second,' containing 'The Restoration of the Hebrews to their own Land,' 8vo (dated Edinburgh, 27 January 1798). 
 'An Essay,' &c. 8vo (on Dan. xii. 7, 11,12; dated London, 2 March 1798). 
 'An Essay on the First Resurrection, and on the Commencement of the Blessed Thousand Years,' 8vo (dated London, 14 April 1798). 
 'The Universe as it is. Discovery of the Ten Tribes of Israel and their Restoration to their own Land,' 1832, 8 vo. 
 'God's Creation of the Universe,' 1848, 8vo (contains some of his letters to the authorities respecting his claims on Brothers's estate ; Mason and Prescot were angry at this publication, but Finlayson had 'a dream and vision' of Brothers, approving all he had done). 
 'The Seven Seals of the Revelations.' 
 'The Last Trumpet,' &c., 1849, 8vo (incorporates No. 7 ; there are several supplements, the latest dated 21 February 1850).

Also nine large sheets of the ground plan of the New Jerusalem (with its 56 squares, 320 streets, 4 temples, 20 colleges, 47 private palaces, 16 markets, &c.); and twelve sheets of views of its public buildings; all these executed by Finlayson for Brothers (the original copper-plates were in the hands of Beauford, whose price for a set of the prints was 38l.) Finlayson's pamphlets are scarce; he deposited his stock with Mason, after whose death it was destroyed.

Personal life
He married, in 1808, Elizabeth Anne (d. 1848), daughter of Colonel Basil Bruce (d. 1800), and had ten children. His eldest son, Richard Brothers Finlayson, who took the name of Richard Beauford, was a photographer at Galway, where he died on 17 December 1886, aged 75.

Old age and death
Finlayson was reduced in extreme and widowed age to a parish allowance of 3s. 6d. weekly, supplemented by 5s. from Busby, in whose house Brothers had lived from 1806 to 1815. Prescot and John Mason (a brush-maker), though a disciple of Brothers, refused to assist him. He died on 19 September 1854, and was buried in the same grave as Brothers at St John's Wood.

References

1770 births
1854 deaths
18th-century Scottish people
19th-century Scottish people
Scottish pamphleteers
British Israelism